CHMA may refer to:

 College Hockey Mid-America
 CFRN (AM), a radio station (1260 AM) licensed to Edmonton, Alberta, Canada, which held the call sign CHMA from 1927 to the 1930s
 CHMA-FM, a radio station (106.9 FM), licensed to Sackville, New Brunswick, Canada

Disambiguation pages
Broadcast call sign disambiguation pages